Joshua Morton (born April 3, 1996) is an American soccer player.

Career

College and amateur
Morton played four years of college soccer at the University of California, Berkeley between 2014 and 2017. While at college, he appeared for Premier Development League side Burlingame Dragons.

Professional
On January 21, 2018, Morton was drafted 84th overall in the 2018 MLS SuperDraft by Chicago Fire.

On March 19, 2018, he signed with Chicago's United Soccer League affiliate club Tulsa Roughnecks.

Personal
Morton graduated from the University of California, Berkeley, with a degree in multi/interdisciplinary studies in 2018 and  worked in HRIS sales as an account executive for failing Houston-based startup, Goco.io. He is now with Trakstar.

References

External links
 

1996 births
Living people
American soccer players
Association football defenders
Burlingame Dragons FC players
California Golden Bears men's soccer players
Chicago Fire FC draft picks
Memphis 901 FC players
People from Brentwood, California
Soccer players from California
Sportspeople from the San Francisco Bay Area
FC Tulsa players
USL Championship players
USL League Two players